Dasychela is a genus of biting horseflies of the family Tabanidae. There are 8 species with a neotropical distribution, with one—D. badia—found in Central America.

Species
Dasychela badia (Kröber, 1931)
Dasychela inca (Philip, 1960)
Dasychela ocellus (Walker, 1848)
Dasychela peruviana (Bigot, 1892)
Dasychela macintyrei (Bequaert, 1937)
Dasychela biramula Fairchild, 1958
Dasychela limbativena Enderlein, 1922

References

Tabanidae
Insects of Central America
Diptera of North America
Diptera of South America
Taxa named by Günther Enderlein
Brachycera genera